Andrej Kollár may refer to:
 Andrej Kollár (ice hockey, born 1977)
 Andrej Kollár (ice hockey, born 1999)